The Immediate Geographic Region of Conselheiro Lafaiete is one of the 10 immediate geographic regions in the Intermediate Geographic Region of Barbacena, one of the 70 immediate geographic regions in the Brazilian state of Minas Gerais and one of the 509 of Brazil, created by the National Institute of Geography and Statistics (IBGE) in 2017.

Municipalities 
It comprises 21 municipalities:

 Belo Vale

 Capela Nova

 Caranaíba

 Carandaí

 Casa Grande

 Catas Altas da Noruega

 Congonhas

 Conselheiro Lafaiete

 Cristiano Otoni

 Desterro de Entre Rios

 Entre Rios de Minas

 Itaverava
 Jeceaba
 Lamim
 Ouro Branco

 Piranga
 Queluzito

 Rio Espera
 Santana dos Montes
 São Brás do Suaçuí

 Senhora de Oliveira

Statistics 
Population: 347 490 (July 1, 2017 estimation).

Area: 5 490,826 km2.

Population density: 63,3/km2.

References 

Geography of Minas Gerais